The General Confederation of Labour of Luxembourg (CGT-L)  is a trade union federation in Luxembourg.

The federation was established in 1927, on the initiative of unions representing railway and metal workers in Luxembourg.  By the 1970s, its largest affiliate was the Luxembourg Workers' Union, which attempted to form a single general union for all workers.  It became the Independent Luxembourg Trade Union Confederation (OGBL), but with many unions deciding not to merge into it, the CGT-L remained in existence.

The CGT-L operates as a loose umbrella organisation, and shares much of its leadership with the OGBL.  As the largest and most representative trade union federation in the country, it is affiliated to the European Trade Union Confederation, and the International Trade Union Confederation.

The number of affiliates of the CGT-L has declined, as a series of mergers have taken place.  In 2020, one of its two affiliates, the National Federation of Railway Workers, Transport Workers, Civil Servants and Luxembourg Employees, agreed to merge into the other, the OGBL.  It is unclear whether this will lead to the dissolution of the CGT-L.

Former affiliates

Presidents
Barthélémy Barbel
1956: Antoine Krier
1970: Mathias Hinterscheid
1977: John Castegnaro
2004: Jean-Claude Reding
2014: André Roeltgen
2019: Nora Back

References 

Trade unions in Luxembourg
Trade unions established in 1927